Carolyn Jane Campbell (born February 17, 1995) is an American professional soccer player who plays as a goalkeeper for the Houston Dash of the NWSL and the United States women's national soccer team . She has also represented the United States on the under-23 and under-17 national teams. In January 2013 at age 17, Campbell became the youngest goalkeeper ever called to a national training camp for the senior United States women's national soccer team. Campbell won a bronze medal in the 2020 Summer Olympics.

Early life
Campbell attended Darlington School, a college-preparatory school in Rome, Georgia. She was named NSCAA All-American in 2011. She was a member of the club "Concord Fire South", and with this team won the under-16 state championship.

Campbell won the under-14 state title with the North Atlanta Soccer Association while playing with their under-12 through under-15 teams. She played for the Silver Backs under-10 and under-11 teams.

Campbell attended Stanford University from 2013–2017 where she studied psychology and played for the Stanford Cardinal. She became the starting goalkeeper during her freshman year. In her sophomore year, Stanford reached the semifinal game of the NCAA Women's College Cup.

Club career

Houston Dash, 2017–  
On January 12, 2017, Campbell was selected by the Houston Dash as the 15th pick in the 2017 NWSL College Draft. A few months later, she was designated as an allocated player for the team. Campbell was named a finalist for 2017 NWSL Rookie of the year.

International career
Campbell was a member of the US team that won the 2012 CONCACAF Women's U-17 Championship in Guatemala and qualified for the Azerbaijan 2012 FIFA U-17 Women's World Cup. In Guatemala, Campbell started and played every minute of all five games; had all shutout games, and made one assist during the tournament on a goal by Andi Sullivan off a booming punt against Trinidad and Tobago women's national football team.

Campbell is undefeated in her U-17 national team career with nine wins, 3 draws and no loss. Campbell first played for U-17 national team at the age of 15; and she attended United States women's national under-23 soccer team training camp in October 2011 as a 16-year-old.

On January 22, 2013, Campbell was called to the national training camp for the first time by head coach Tom Sermanni, to train with the team who were training for a friendly match ahead of the 2013 Algarve Cup. She made her senior team debut in April 2017 in a friendly against Russia, coming on as a second-half substitute for Ashlyn Harris.

On August 23, 2018 she was named to the United States U-23 team for the 2018 Nordic tournament.

Campbell was a member of the U.S. Women's National Team in the 2020 Summer Olympics. Although she did not appear in any games in Tokyo, she won a bronze medal as a member of the team.

Personal life
Campbell was on Headmaster's List in 2010 and was a member of the National Honor Society in 2012. Both of her parents are former Navy fighter pilots, and both parents were collegiate athletes. Her mother Chrystal rowed crew at the Naval Academy and her father Mike played hockey and rowed crew at Wesleyan University in Middletown, Connecticut. She followed the footsteps of her grandfather and great-great-grandfather to Stanford University in 2013.

References

External links

 
 U.S. Soccer player profile
 
 Stanford player profile
 Houston Dash player profile
 

1995 births
Living people
People from Kennesaw, Georgia
Sportspeople from Cobb County, Georgia
Soccer players from Georgia (U.S. state)
American women's soccer players
Women's association football goalkeepers
Darlington School alumni
Stanford Cardinal women's soccer players
Houston Dash draft picks
Houston Dash players
National Women's Soccer League players
United States women's under-20 international soccer players
United States women's international soccer players
Footballers at the 2020 Summer Olympics
Olympic bronze medalists for the United States in soccer
Medalists at the 2020 Summer Olympics